Pioner is a rural locality (a settlement) in Levchunovskoye Rural Settlement, Nikolayevsky District, Volgograd Oblast, Russia. The population was 290 as of 2010. There are 14 streets.

Geography 
Pioner is located in steppe on the left bank of the Volgograd Reservoir, 22 km northeast of Nikolayevsk (the district's administrative centre) by road. Iskra is the nearest rural locality.

References 

Rural localities in Nikolayevsky District, Volgograd Oblast